Never Apologise Never Explain is the eighth full-length album by the rock band Therapy?, and the second to be released on Spitfire Records. It was released on 27 September 2004. The album was recorded in June 2004 at Parkgate Studios, Hastings.

"Never Apologise Never Explain" marked a return to the claustrophobic sound of the band's early releases. It failed to chart in the Top 200 of the UK Albums Chart. The album was not released in North America.

The album was released on CD only. A limited edition CD-ROM of the album contains two live videos ("Teethgrinder" & "Who Knows") from the Scopophobia DVD.

Polish label Metal Mind Productions re-released the album on 2 November 2009. The album was remastered using 24-Bit technology, limited to 1000 copies, on a gold disk digipak CD.

Track listing 
All songs written by Therapy?

Personnel 
Therapy?
 Andy Cairns – vocals, guitar
 Neil Cooper – drums
 Michael McKeegan – bass
Technical
 Pete Bartlett – producer, mixer
 Simon Wakeling – engineer
 Giles Hall – mixer
 Chris Potter and John Davis – mastering
 Iona Bateman – photography
 Simon Leigh – photography
 Curt Evans – design

Singles 
 "Polar Bear"/"Rock You Monkeys" was a double A-side download only single released on 13 June 2005 with a live version of "Die Laughing" from the Alive Festival in Belgium, 31 July 2004.
 "Rise Up (Make Yourself Well) was released as a radio only single in 2004.
 "Die Like a Motherfucker" was released as a radio only single in 2005.
 "Long Distance" was released as a radio only single in Belgium in 2005.
 "Perish the Thought" was released as a radio only single in Belgium in 2005.

Promo videos 
 "Rise Up (Make Yourself Well)"
 "Rock You Monkeys": directed by Andre Thyret

Origins of the phrase 
The originator of this commonly used phrase, often attributed to members of the House of Windsor (British Royalty), Duke of Wellington, Benjamin Disraeli and others, is said to be John Arbuthnot Fisher, a notable British Admiral of the Victorian and Edwardian era. ("Boldness has genius, power and magic in it ... Never contradict. Never explain. Never apologise").
And even earlier, King Charles I of England is quoted in The Oxford Dictionary of Quotations as writing "Never make a defence or apology before you be accused", in a letter to Lord Wentworth as long ago as 1636.

References 

2004 albums
Therapy? albums
Albums produced by Pete Bartlett
Spitfire Records albums